The first season of Laverne & Shirley, an American television sitcom series, began airing on January 27, 1976 on ABC. The season concluded on May 18, 1976 after 15 episodes.

The series is a spin-off from Happy Days, as the two lead characters were originally introduced on that series as acquaintances of Fonzie (Henry Winkler). Set in roughly the same time period, the timeline runs from approximately 1958, when the series began, through 1967, when the series ended. As with Happy Days, it was made by Paramount Television, created by Garry Marshall (along with Lowell Ganz and Mark Rothman) and executive produced by Garry Marshall, Edward K. Milkis, and Thomas L. Miller from Miller-Boyett Productions. 

The season aired Tuesdays at 8:30-9:00 pm (EST), with a lead-in from its parent series, Happy Days. Its only competition was a CBS series titled Popi. It ranked 3rd among television programs and garnered a 27.5 rating. The entire season was released on DVD in North America on August 17, 2004.

Overview
The series revolves around the titular characters Laverne DeFazio and Shirley Feeney, bottle-cappers at Shotz Brewery in 1950s Milwaukee, Wisconsin. Episode plots include their adventures with neighbors and friends, Lenny and Squiggy.

Cast

Starring
Penny Marshall as Laverne DeFazio
Cindy Williams as Shirley Feeney
Michael McKean as Leonard "Lenny" Kosnowski
David Lander as Andrew "Squiggy" Squiggman
Phil Foster as Frank DeFazio
Eddie Mekka as Carmine Ragusa

Guest Starring
Henry Winkler as Arthur "Fonzie" Fonzarelli
Robert Hays as Tom
Fred Willard as Charles
Mark Harmon as Victor
Pat Carroll as Lily Feeney, Shirley's mother

Episodes

References

Laverne & Shirley seasons
1976 American television seasons